Polyclinic Medical Center, also known as Polyclinic Hospital, is a polyclinic in Harrisburg, Pennsylvania, and part of UPMC Pinnacle, a regional system of the University of Pittsburgh Medical Center (UPMC) that serves South Central Pennsylvania. Originally opening in 1909. Most of the building is occupied by Pennsylvania Psychiatric Institute. On other floors are other programs, including two addiction clinics, physical and occupational therapy, audiology and hearing center, HIV clinic, outpatient laboratory, primary care office, and surgery optimization.

The original building housing the first hospital at this location, dates to 1925–1926, with expansions in 1949–1952, 1955, 1959, and 1960. Its architecture is that of the Colonial Revival period. It was listed on the National Register of Historic Places in 2004.

See also
 List of hospitals in Harrisburg

References

External links
 Official Web page

Colonial Revival architecture in Pennsylvania
Hospital buildings completed in 1926
Hospital buildings on the National Register of Historic Places in Pennsylvania
Hospitals in Harrisburg, Pennsylvania
National Register of Historic Places in Harrisburg, Pennsylvania
University of Pittsburgh Medical Center